The Weihai City Commercial Bank Stadium, formerly known as the Gubo Chengshan Stadium (Simplified Chinese: 成山体育场) (also known as the Weihai Stadium) (Simplified Chinese: 威海市体育场)  is a multi-use stadium in Weihai, China.  It is currently used mostly for football matches and athletics events.  It hosts the home games of Weihai Aisen.  The stadium has a capacity of 31,800 people and opened in March 2002. It is located on 78 Wenhua Middle Road, Weihai.

Footnotes

Sports venues in Shandong
Football venues in China
Weihai